Robert John Duliba (born January 9, 1935) is a former Major League Baseball relief pitcher.  The ,  right-hander played for the St. Louis Cardinals (1959–60, 1962), Los Angeles Angels (1963–1964), Boston Red Sox (1965) and Kansas City Athletics (1967).

Duliba made his major league debut on August 11, 1959, against the San Francisco Giants at Busch Stadium.  He pitched two scoreless innings in the 5–4 Cardinal loss.  He struck out one batter, outfielder Jackie Brandt.  He earned his first big league save eighteen days later in a home game against the Cincinnati Reds.

After relieving in 28 games with a 2.06 earned run average for the Cardinals in 1962, he was traded to the Los Angeles Angels for relief pitcher Bob Botz.  In 1964, Duliba had his busiest season, finishing in the American League top ten in games pitched (58) and games finished (35).  He was 6–4 with nine saves and an ERA of 3.59 for the Angels that season.

Traded to the Boston organization the following spring, Duliba appeared in 39 games for the 1965 Red Sox and led the team's pitching staff in earned run average (3.17). Duliba closed out his major league career with the A's in 1967, their last season in Kansas City.

Career totals include 176 games pitched, all in relief, a 17–12 record, 93 games finished, and 14 saves.  In 257 innings pitched he allowed 257 hits and 96 walks for a WHIP of 1.374.  He struck out 129 and had an earned run average of 3.47.

External links

Retrosheet

1935 births
Living people
Allentown Cardinals players
Atlanta Crackers players
Baseball players from Pennsylvania
Boston Red Sox players
Hawaii Islanders players
Iowa Oaks players
Kansas City Athletics players
Los Angeles Angels players
Major League Baseball pitchers
Omaha Cardinals players
Ozark Eagles players
People from Luzerne County, Pennsylvania
Peoria Chiefs players
Richmond Braves players
St. Louis Cardinals players
Toronto Maple Leafs (International League) players
Vancouver Mounties players